= William R. Moultray =

American politician

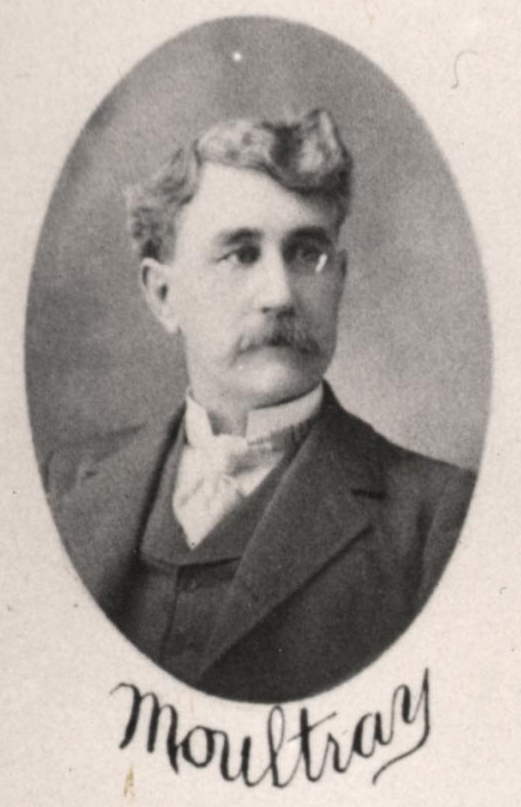
- Moultray in 1901

Member of the Washington State Senate
- In office 1901–1903 (33rd district); 1903–1905 (41st district)

Member of the Washington House of Representatives
- In office 1889–1891

Personal details
- Born: September 10, 1852 Missouri, United States
- Died: November 20, 1930 (aged 78) Bellingham, Washington, United States
- Party: Republican

William Riley Moultray (September 10, 1852 – November 20, 1930) was an American politician in the state of Washington. He served in the Washington State Senate from 1901 to 1905.
